"All I Ever Need Is You" is a popular song written by Jimmy Holiday and Eddie Reeves, and initially recorded by Ray Charles for his 1971 album, Volcanic Action of My Soul. The most well-known version of the song is the hit single by Sonny & Cher which, in 1971, reached No. 7 on the U.S. Billboard Hot 100, and was their single of greatest chart longevity, spending 15 weeks on that chart. Their album by the same title sold over 500,000 copies reaching RIAA gold status.

"All I Ever Need Is You" by Sonny & Cher also topped the U.S. Easy Listening chart for five weeks late in 1971. It was a top-ten single in both the United Kingdom and Canada. It has sold more than 2,250,000 copies worldwide.

Two versions made the country music charts: Ray Sanders (No. 18) in 1971, and Kenny Rogers and Dottie West (No. 1) in 1979. The Rogers and West recording was included on four albums: Classics in 1979 selling over 2,000,000 copies; Duets in 1984 selling over 1,000,000 copies; 42 Ultimate Hits in 2004 selling over 500,000 copies and 21 Number Ones in 2006 selling over 500,000 copies.
 
A 1984 Dutch version titled “Ik Meen ‘t” by recording artist Andre Hazes reached No. 1 for two weeks on March 9 and 16, 1985 on the pop singles chart in the Netherlands.  
 
“All I Ever Need Is You” was associated with two Grammy Award nominations: 1972 Grammy Award for Best Pop Performance by a Duo or Group with Vocals, Sonny & Cher, "All I Ever Need Is You"; and 1973 “Best Country Instrumental Performance”, Chet Atkins & Jerry Reed, Me and Chet (the album included “All I Ever Need Is You”). The song was also recorded by Tom Jones, Sammi Smith and several others.

Chart performance

Sonny & Cher

Weekly charts

Ray Sanders

Overlanders

Kenny Rogers and Dottie West

Year-end charts

References

External links
 

1971 songs
Ray Charles songs
Sonny & Cher songs
Kenny Rogers songs
Dottie West songs
Male–female vocal duets
Ray Sanders (singer) songs
United Artists Records singles
MCA Records singles
Songs written by Jimmy Holiday